In programming languages, an abstract type is a type in a nominative type system that cannot be instantiated directly; a type that is not abstract – which can be instantiated – is called a concrete type. Every instance of an abstract type is an instance of some concrete subtype. Abstract types are also known as existential types.

An abstract type may provide no implementation, or an incomplete implementation. In some languages, abstract types with no implementation (rather than an incomplete implementation) are known as protocols, interfaces, signatures, or class types. In class-based object-oriented programming, abstract types are implemented as abstract classes (also known as abstract base classes), and concrete types as concrete classes. In generic programming, the analogous notion is a concept, which similarly specifies syntax and semantics, but does not require a subtype relationship: two unrelated types may satisfy the same concept.

Often, abstract types will have one or more implementations provided separately, for example, in the form of concrete subtypes that can be instantiated. In object-oriented programming, an abstract class may include abstract methods or abstract properties that are shared by its subclasses. Other names for language features that are (or may be) used to implement abstract types include traits, mixins, flavors, roles, or type classes.

Signifying abstract types 

Abstract classes can be created, signified, or simulated in several ways:
 By use of the explicit keyword  in the class definition, as in Java, D or C#.
 By including, in the class definition, one or more abstract methods (called pure virtual functions in C++), which the class is declared to accept as part of its protocol, but for which no implementation is provided.
 By inheriting from an abstract type, and not overriding all missing features necessary to complete the class definition.  In other words, a child type that doesn't implement all abstract methods from its parent becomes abstract itself.
 In many dynamically typed languages such as Smalltalk, any class that sends a particular method to this, but doesn't implement that method, can be considered abstract.  (However, in many such languages, like Objective-C, the error is not detected until the class is used, and the message returns results in an exception error message such as "Does not recognize selector: xxx" as - [NSObject doesNotRecognizeSelector:(SEL)selector] is invoked upon detection of an unimplemented method).

Example (Java) 

//By default, all methods in all classes are concrete, unless the abstract keyword is used.
abstract class Demo {
    // An abstract class may include abstract methods, which have no implementation.
    abstract public int sum(int x, int y);

    // An abstract class may also include concrete methods.
    public int product(int x, int y) { return x*y; }
}

//By default, all methods in all interfaces are abstract, unless the default keyword is used.
interface DemoInterface {
    [abstract] int getLength(); //Abstract can be used here, though is completely useless
    
    //The default keyword can be used in this context to specify a concrete method in an interface
    default int product(int x, int y) {
        return x * y;
    }
}

Use of abstract types 

Abstract types are an important feature in statically typed OOP languages. Many dynamically typed languages have no equivalent feature (although the use of duck typing makes abstract types unnecessary); however traits are found in some modern dynamically-typed languages.

Some authors argue that classes should be leaf classes (have no subtypes), or else be abstract.

Abstract types are useful in that they can be used to define and enforce a protocol; a set of operations that all objects implementing the protocol must support.

Abstract types are also an essential part of the Template Method Pattern.

See also 
 Class
 Concept
 Type class

References

Further reading
 
Core Java: An Integrated Approach by  R. Nageswara Rao

External links 
 "Abstract or Skeletal Interfaces Explained" 
 Types and Programming Languages by Benjamin Pierce (MIT Press 2002) 
 Abstract type at Rosetta Code

Type theory
Articles with example Java code

sv:Klass (programmering)#Abstrakt klass